Urlingford is a town, as well as a civil parish within the barony of Galmoy. It is located in the north west of County Kilkenny, along the boundary with County Tipperary, in Leinster, Ireland.

Access
The town lies on the R639. The M8 motorway runs just west of the town, from which both Urlingford and nearby Johnstown are accessed via junction four. Urlingford is a bus hub, with major operator JJ Kavanagh and Sons based there. As a result, until September 2013 the Bus Éireann Dublin to Cork bus service called here. It is now replaced by route 828 which connects with express buses at Portlaoise and Cashel.

Toponymy
The Irish name Áth na nUrlainn means "ford of the slaughter" and has been anglicised as Aghnenurlin, Aghnenoorlin, Awnanoorlin and similar.

History 

In 1526, Piers Butler, 8th Earl of Ormond, gave possession of the lands of Urlingford to John Tobin and Nicolas Mothing (chaplins). The earlier settlement was focused around the castle, church and graveyard.

The town had an organised planned growth with traditional plot patterns. It was built over a cut-over bog, an extension to the Templetuohy Bog, much of which has been reclaimed. Urlingford is a linear town around the focused primary axis, the Main Street. In 1837 it was the centre of manufacture of coarse stuffs, flannels, and worsteds, and carries on an extensive retail trade with the surrounding districts.

The town was recorded on Griffith's Valuation in 1864. Urlingford has taken part in the Tidy Towns Competition.

Rivers
A minor tributary of the River Nore, the River Goul, enters the town from the southeast. It sources 6 kilometers away from the town in the Slieveardagh hills.  The river passes under the Main Street and towards the bridge at Urlingford Castle (and mill).

Buildings
There is a library in Urlingford which is based in the old courthouse. Urlingford Castle and mill are located in Urlingford.

Sport
Emeralds GAA is a junior Gaelic Athletic Association club, founded in 1972.

See also
 List of towns and villages in Ireland
 List of census towns of Ireland

References

Sources

External links
 
 

Towns and villages in County Kilkenny
Census towns in County Kilkenny